Impromptu is a 1991 period drama film directed by James Lapine, written by Sarah Kernochan, produced by Daniel A. Sherkow and Stuart Oken, and starring Hugh Grant as Frédéric Chopin and Judy Davis as George Sand. It was shot entirely on location in France as a British production by an American company. Its main filming location was at the Chateau des Briottières outside of Angers, in the Loire Valley.

Plot
Since getting divorced, Baroness Amantine-Lucile-Aurore Dupin (previously Baroness Dudevant, the successful and notorious writer of sensational romance novels), now lives under the pseudonym George Sand, in Paris, and has been in the habit of dressing like a man. In her romantic pursuit of the sensitive Frédéric Chopin, whose music she fell in love with before meeting him, George/Aurora is advised that she must act like a man pursuing a woman, though also advised to avoid damaging Chopin's health by pursuing him. With this advice she is deterred by a fellow countrywoman  (the mistress of Franz Liszt) the Countess Marie d'Agoult, acting like she is smitten with Chopin to prevent a relationship between Chopin and Sand.

Sand meets Chopin in 1836 in the French countryside house of the Duchess d'Antan, a foolish aspiring socialite who invites artists from Paris to her salon to feel cosmopolitan. Sand invites herself, hoping to meet Chopin, not knowing that a few of her former lovers are also in attendance. A small play is written by Alfred de Musset is presented, satirizing the aristocracy and specifically mocking their hostess. When Chopin protests at this lack of manners, de Musset bellows and a fireplace explosion ensues.

Chopin is briefly swayed by a beautifully written love letter ostensibly from d'Agoult, actually written by, and stolen from, Sand. Eventually Sand wins over Chopin when she proves that she wrote the letter, reciting it to him passionately. And after buying a copy of her memoir, he finds the text of the letter in the book.

Chopin is then challenged to a duel by one of Sand's ex-lovers. He faints during the face-off. Sand finishes the duel for him and nurses him back to health in the countryside, solidifying their relationship.

Near the end of the movie, Sand and Chopin dedicate a volume of music to the countess, although this only suggests that she has had an affair with Chopin, causing a falling-out with her lover Liszt. Sand and Chopin depart for Majorca, relieved to escape the competitive nature of artistic alliances and jealousies in Paris.

Cast
 Judy Davis as George Sand (Amantine-Lucile-Aurore Dupin)
 Hugh Grant as Frédéric Chopin
 Mandy Patinkin as Alfred de Musset
 Bernadette Peters as Marie Catherine Sophie, Comtesse d'Agoult
 Julian Sands as Franz Liszt
 Ralph Brown as Eugène Delacroix
 Georges Corraface as Felicien Mallefille
 Anton Rodgers as Duke d'Antan
 Emma Thompson as Duchess d'Antan
 Anna Massey as Sophie-Victorie Delaborde, George Sand's Mother

The film's supporting performances include David Birkin as Maurice, John Savident as Buloz, Lucy Speed as Young Aurora, and Elizabeth Spriggs as Baroness Laginsky.

Production
Sarah Kernochan, director James Lapine's wife, had written the film in 1988 during a lay-off due to 1988 Writers Guild of America strike. Kernochan explained the film: "How do complicated people find a simple way of loving?" The producer Stuart Oken liked the project; his concern was to give Lapine "a chance to realize his vision and become a movie director." Oken brought the project to his friend and fellow producer, Dan Sherkow, who secured financing and distribution for the picture.

For the cast, Lapine wanted "to use people he had worked with before." He cast actors who "didn't look like, but embodied the characters." Judy Davis and Mandy Patinkin could "hardly look more unlike the cultural icons they portray." Lapine hired a piano coach and a music consultant to advise Grant and Sands on piano techniques.

Due to Common Market legalities, the film was incorporated as a British production with co-production by the French company Ariane Films and distribution by the United States company Sovereign Pictures. The budget was $6 million.

Music
Chopin:
 Impromptu No. 1 in A-flat major (Op. 29)
 Ballade No. 1 in G minor (Op. 23)
 Polonaise in A major "Military" (Op. 40, No.1)
 Etude in E minor "Wrong Note" (Op. 25, No. 5)
 Prelude in G-sharp minor (Op. 28, No. 12)
 Prelude in D-flat major "Raindrop" (Op. 28, No. 15)
 Etude in G-flat major "Butterfly" (Op. 25, No. 9)
 Nouvelle Etude No. 1 in F minor
 Etude in C-sharp minor (Op. 10, No. 4)
 Waltz in D-flat major "Minute" (Op. 64, No. 1)
 Fantasy-Impromptu in C-sharp minor (Op. 66)
 Nocturne in F major (Op. 15, No. 1)
 Etude in A-flat major "Aeolian Harp" (Op. 25, No. 1)

Liszt:
 Apres d'une lecture de Dante (from Années de Pèlerinage, 2nd year)
 Transcendental Etude No. 4 "Mazeppa"
 Grand galop chromatique

Beethoven:
 Symphony No.6 in F major "Pastoral"

Release, reception
Impromptu was released on 12 April 1991 in the United Kingdom. It was later broadcast on PBS's Masterpiece Theatre in 1993.

Critical reception
On Rotten Tomatoes, the film has an approval rating of 76% based on 17 reviews, with an average score of 6/10. Jeff Millar of the Houston Chronicle wrote that the film is "a zingy, impudent little essay on gender, with the exquisitely confusing George Sand at its center." Roger Ebert of the Chicago Sun-Times awarded the film 3/4 stars, writing, "The film has little serious interest in George Sand, and almost none in the novels that are all that remain of her, but diverts itself with scandal, atmosphere, location, and witty repartee."

Janet Maslin of The New York Times gave the film a positive review, likening it to the films of Ken Russell. Speaking of director James Lapine's approach, Maslin said, "Handling this material playfully, he tosses together the film's artistic luminaries and allows them to indulge in outrageous antics, like the scene that finds Sand pleading for Chopin's affections and telling him she needs only a minute of his time to explain her feelings." Terrence Rafferty wrote in The New Yorker that the film was "an ebullient and absurdly entertaining account of the famous love affair of George Sand and Frédéric Chopin. ...The historical figures in this movie are cartoons, but they’re cartoons with recognizable human qualities, and the actors look as if they were having a wonderful time charging around in their period costumes. Hugh Grant’s Chopin is a brilliant caricature of the Romantic ideal of the artist; he gives the character an air of befuddled unworldliness, and punctuates his readings with delicately timed tubercular coughs. Judy Davis plays Sand—a great actress in a great role."

Accolades

References

External links
 
 

1991 films
Films about classical music and musicians
Musical films based on actual events
Films directed by James Lapine
Films set in the 1830s
Biographical films about composers
Biographical films about writers
Cultural depictions of Frédéric Chopin
Cultural depictions of George Sand
Cultural depictions of Franz Liszt
1991 directorial debut films
1991 independent films
1990s English-language films